Fendler is a German surname.  Notable people with the surname include:

Augustus Fendler (1813–1883), Prussian-born American natural history collector
Donn Fendler (born 1927), American whose disappearance launched a manhunt
Lothar Fendler (1913–1983), German SS officer and Holocaust perpetrator

German-language surnames